William Casey Weldon (born February 3, 1969) is a former professional American football player. Weldon is best known for being the quarterback for Florida State in the late-1980s and early-1990s. During his senior season in 1991, Weldon finished runner-up in the Heisman Trophy balloting to Desmond Howard of Michigan. He also played in the National Football League (NFL), World League and for the Birmingham Thunderbolts of the XFL.

High school coaching career
Weldon played high school quarterback at North Florida Christian High School, and he returned there as the varsity head football coach in 2006. On December 12, 2007, and after getting NFC to the Florida division 1A state championship game twice in his two years as head coach, but losing both times, NFC fired him and rehired former NFC head coach Tim Cokely. Weldon finished his two-year NFC career with an overall record of 23–5. In May 2008 he was hired as the new offensive coordinator at Leon High School.

External links
BUCPOWER bio

1969 births
Living people
Florida State University alumni
American football quarterbacks
Florida State Seminoles football players
Tampa Bay Buccaneers players
Washington Redskins players
Barcelona Dragons players
Birmingham Thunderbolts players
Philadelphia Eagles players